The Slanted Screen is a 2006 documentary film written, produced, and directed by Jeff Adachi which examines the stereotypical portrayals and absence of East Asian males in the cinema of the United States. The film analyzes Hollywood from the silent era to the 21st century.

Synopsis 
The Slanted Screen features interviews of variety of Asian American filmmakers, critics, producers, and actors, along with several film clips. It observes stereotypical portrayals of Asian American men in Hollywood such as Mr. Moto and Charlie Chan. The film also discusses the importance of influential Asian actors in Hollywood, such as Sessue Hayakawa and Bruce Lee.

The film is organized in chronological order, examining the portrayal of Asian Americans in Hollywood from around the 1920s to the 21st century and the future of Asian Americans in film. In order to have more inclusive representation, the film highlights the importance of having more roles that are designed for Asian Americans, and also having more directors, writers, and executives of different ethnicities. With the rise of independent Asian American writers writing outside of the Hollywood system getting critics' approval, the film concludes on a positive note and encourages young actors to be rebellious and creative.

Release and Reception 
The Slanted Screen had its formal premiere on March 19, 2006, at the San Francisco Asian American Film Festival, though the first screening of the film took place at the Laemmle Fairfax Theatre in Los Angeles on March 12, 2006. It was later shown at the New York Independent Film and Video Festival, where it won Best Documentary, and the Berkeley Film Festival, where it won the Grand Festival Prize before its television premiere on PBS in 2007.

Critical Response 
G. Allen Johnson of SFGate called it "an informative and extremely entertaining look at how Asian American men have been portrayed by Hollywood." Marilyn Moss wrote in The Hollywood Reporter that the documentary was "a no-nonsense, humorless trek through much footage, without much context and without a large idea." Dennis Harvey's review in Variety noted "squeezing too much material into a TV-styled hour, pic’s insights are mostly superficial."

Interviewees

Films and television shows featured
The following films and television shows are featured in The Slanted Screen:

See also
Stereotypes of East Asians in the United States
Portrayal of East Asians in Hollywood

References

External links

Documentary films about Asian Americans
Asian-American issues
Films about Chinese Americans
Documentary films about racism in the cinema of the United States